The 2022 Hampton Pirates football team represented the Hampton University as a first year member of the Colonial Athletic Association during the 2022 NCAA Division I FCS football season. Led by third-year head coach Robert Prunty, the Pirates played their home games at the Armstrong Stadium in Hampton, Virginia.

Previous season

The 2021 team finished with a record of 5–6, 3–4 in Big South play, finishing in a four-way tie for 3rd place place. This was Hampton's final season as a member of the Big South Conference. The Pirates will be joining the Colonial Athletic Association (CAA) for all sports starting in 2022–23.

Schedule

Game summaries

Howard

Tuskegee

at Norfolk State

at No. 8 Delaware

Maine

at Albany

No. 19 Richmond

at Villanova

No. 8 William & Mary

No. 18 Elon

at Towson

References

Hampton
Hampton Pirates football seasons
Hampton Pirates football